is a Japanese orchestral tuba player. Sugiyama is the first successful applicant as an Asian to the audition for Wiener Staatsoper Orchester. Since 2006, Sugiyama has played in the Cleveland Orchestra.

Biography 
1990 - Graduated from Soai University.
August 1990 - Kyoto Symphony Orchestra Guest player. (until 1991)
1993 - Accompany the Osaka Philharmonic Orchestra Europe Tour.
October 1995 - Joined the Osaka Symphoniker. (until 1996)
November 1995 - Awarded 1st Prize in Japan Wind and Percussion Competition (Category Tuba)
September 1997 - Joined the New Japan Philharmonic. (until 2003)
1998 - Participated in Saito Kinen Festival Matsumoto.
June 2003 - Won the first successful applicant as an Asian to the audition for Wiener Staatsoper Orchester.
2006 - Join the Cleveland Orchestra.

References

External links 
杉山康人の部屋 
Music from the Western Reserve - Cleveland Brass Works

Japanese classical tubists
1967 births
Living people
Cleveland Institute of Music faculty
20th-century Japanese musicians
21st-century Japanese musicians
21st-century tubists